The 1953–54 Georgetown Hoyas men's basketball team represented Georgetown University during the 1953–54 NCAA  college basketball season. Harry "Buddy" Jeannette coached them in his second season as head coach. The team was an independent and played its home games at McDonough Gymnasium on the Georgetown campus in Washington, D.C. It finished the season with a record of 11-18 and had no postseason play.

Season recap

Sophomore forward Warren Buehler joined the varsity team as a starter after a year on the freshman team, replacing star Bill Bolger, who had graduated after the previous season. Destined to become the top Georgetown scorer of the 1950s, Buehler got off to a quick start, ending the season as the teams top scorer for the first of two consecutive seasons. Playing in 28 of the seasons 29 games, he scored in double figures 26 times, including 29 points each against Pittsburgh and Duquesne, 30 against Detroit, and a career-high 36 points against Virginia – in a game which Georgetown nonetheless lost when Virginias Buzzy Wilkinson scored 45 points against the Hoyas. By the end of the year, Buehler had scored a Georgetown-record 511 points and averaged 18.2 points per game, second in school history.

Senior guard and team co-captain Lou Gigante had starred for the team during the two previous seasons, and began another strong season this year, averaging in double figures. During the game against New York University at Madison Square Garden in New York City on January 12, 1954, however, he broke his foot, ending his season and collegiate career. He had averaged 9.2 points per game during his three varsity seasons.

The previous season, Georgetown had made its first-ever appearance in the National Invitation Tournament and its first post-season tournament appearance since the 1942-43 team went to the 1943 NCAA Tournament. In sharp contrast, this season was a disappointment: In the face of academic losses and injuries that would plague the Hoyas throughout the last three seasons of Buddy Jeannettes four-year tenure as head coach, – in addition to losing Gigante to an injury, the team lost one of its top scorers at midseason to an academic suspension – the Hoyas finished with a record of 11-18 and had no post-season play. They were not ranked in the Top 20 in the Associated Press Poll or Coaches' Poll at any time.

Roster
Sources

After senior guard Lou Gigante suffered an injury, senior guard Jim Frisby replaced him on the team. Both wore No. 13 during the season.

1953–54 schedule and results

Sources

|-
!colspan=9 style="background:#002147; color:#8D817B;"| Regular Season

References

Georgetown Hoyas men's basketball seasons
Georgetown
Georgetown Hoyas men's basketball team
Georgetown Hoyas men's basketball team